Bissel may refer to:

 Bissel bogie or Bissel axle (sometimes spelt Bissell), a type of steam locomotive wheelset
 Bissel (Greyhawk), the fictitious Dungeons and Dragons state

See also
 Bissell (disambiguation)